The Dewey Baronetcy, of South Hill Wood in Bromley, in the County of Kent, is a title in the Baronetage of the United Kingdom. It was created on 20 February 1917 for Thomas Charles Dewey, President of the Prudential Assurance Company. The second Baronet was a clergyman and served as Prebendary of Exeter Cathedral from 1935 to 1943. He was also Sheriff of Devon in 1935.

Dewey baronets, of South Hill Wood (1917)
Sir Thomas Charles Dewey, 1st Baronet (1840–1926)
Sir Stanley Daws Dewey, 2nd Baronet (1867–1948)
Sir Anthony Hugh Grahame Dewey, 3rd Baronet (1921–2016)
Sir Rupert Grahame Dewey, 4th Baronet (born 1953)

The heir apparent is Thomas Andrew Dewey (born 1982).

Notes

References
Kidd, Charles, Williamson, David (editors). Debrett's Peerage and Baronetage (1990 edition). New York: St Martin's Press, 1990, 

Dewey